Eois sundasimilis is a moth in the family Geometridae. It is found on Borneo and possibly Peninsular Malaysia. The habitat consists of lowland dipterocarp forests.

The length of the forewings is 10 mm for males and 9 mm for females. The ground colour is deep yellow with diffuse reddish fasciation.

References

Moths described in 1997
Eois
Moths of Asia